Bruce M. Snell Jr. (August 18, 1929 – December 20, 2019) was an American judge who served as a justice of the Iowa Supreme Court from 1987 to 2001.

Snell was born in Ida Grove, Iowa. He received a Bachelor of Arts from Grinnell College in 1951, and then served in the United States Army. He received a law degree from the University of Iowa College of Law in 1956, and was a law clerk to Judge Henry Norman Graven of the United States District Court for the Northern District of Iowa. Snell moved to New York City to practice law, later returning to Iowa and serving as assistant Iowa Attorney General. He practiced law in Ida Grove until 1976, when he was appointed to the Iowa Court of Appeals, where he remained until his appointment to the Iowa Supreme Court. He was a justice of the Iowa Supreme Court from October 8, 1987, to August 18, 2001.

References

External links

1929 births
2019 deaths
Justices of the Iowa Supreme Court
20th-century American judges